Sean Lyons is an American college baseball coach and former outfielder. Lyons is the head coach of the SIU Edwardsville Cougars baseball team.

Playing career
Thompson attended Eastern Illinois University, where he was a member of the Eastern Illinois Panthers baseball team. Lyons was a first team All-Ohio Valley Conference (OVC selection in 1997 and 1998 while earning second team All-OVC honors as a senior in 1999.  He led the team in both hits and doubles all three seasons graduating as the school's career leader in both categories.

Coaching career
Lyons began his coaching career at Liberty High School in Liberty, Missouri. In 2001, he was hired to join the Eastern Illinois coaching staff, where he spent two seasons. In 2008, he was hired to join the staff of the Bradley Braves baseball program.

On June 21, 2016, Lyons was named the head coach of the SIU Edwardsville Cougars baseball team.

Head coaching record

See also
 List of current NCAA Division I baseball coaches

References

External links
Bradley Braves bio
SIU Edwardsville Cougars bio

Living people
1977 births
Baseball outfielders
Eastern Illinois Panthers baseball players
High school baseball coaches in the United States
Eastern Illinois Panthers baseball coaches
Bradley Braves baseball coaches
SIU Edwardsville Cougars baseball coaches
Baseball coaches from Illinois